Frank Cunningham Fryer (2 November 1886 – 22 September 1958) was a New Zealand rugby union player. His position of choice was wing three-quarter. Fryer was educated at Christ's College where he was a member of the 1st XV between 1902 and 1904. Fryer represented Canterbury at a provincial level, and was a member of the New Zealand national side, the All Blacks, from 1907 to 1908. He played nine matches for the All Blacks including four internationals.

References

1886 births
1958 deaths
Rugby union players from Christchurch
People educated at Christ's College, Christchurch
New Zealand rugby union players
New Zealand international rugby union players
Canterbury rugby union players
Rugby union wings